San Tammaro is a comune (municipality) in the Province of Caserta in the Italian region Campania, located about  north of Naples and about  west of Caserta.

San Tammaro borders the following municipalities: Capua, Casal di Principe, Casaluce, Frignano, Santa Maria Capua Vetere, Santa Maria la Fossa, Villa di Briano.

References

Cities and towns in Campania